Zarina Baibatina (born 11 May 1984) is a visually impaired Kazakhstani Paralympic judoka. She represented Kazakhstan at the 2020 Summer Paralympics in Tokyo, Japan and she won the silver medal in the women's +70 kg event.

References

External links 
 

1984 births
Living people
People from Pavlodar Region
Kazakhstani female judoka
Judoka at the 2020 Summer Paralympics
Medalists at the 2020 Summer Paralympics
Paralympic judoka of Kazakhstan
Paralympic medalists in judo
Paralympic silver medalists for Kazakhstan
21st-century Kazakhstani women